Bilta  also known as Balta or Balţah, is an antique town in northern Tunisia, close to Mateur in today's Bizerte governorate. Its name comes from the Numidian language (Lybico-Berber) root BLT, meaning, filled with water.

An inscription in the nearby fundus Aufidianus contains the name of the place: Agricolae in spl(endida) (vel spl(endidissima)/re p(ublica) Bihensi Bilt[a](vel Belt[a]).

During Vandal and Byzantine times, bishops are attested: in 256 AD, a Caecilius is episcopus in Bilta (or Biltha, or Belta), in 411, a donatist named Felicianus is in Viltensis and in 646, a bishop Theodorus in Biltensis signs a letter sent to the Lateran Council of 649. 

The town is a titular see of the Roman Catholic church.

It is not to be mistaken for the modern town of Balta-Bou Aouene in the Jendouba governorate.

References

Populated places in Tunisia
Catholic titular sees in Africa